California Hall, originally named Das Deutsches Haus (English: The German House), is a historic commercial building and event venue built in 1912, and located in the Civic Center neighborhood in San Francisco, California. It started as a German social meeting hall. 

At the 1965 Year Years Ball, a fundraiser took place in the building for many gay charities, and brought trouble with the police and a legal battle. The event marked a turning point in gay rights in the west coast. It later was a popular concert hall in the mid-1960s and 1970s; performers that played at the California Hall include Jefferson Airplane, Moby Grape, Big Brother and the Holding Company, the Grateful Dead, and Quicksilver Messenger Service. 

The building previously housed the California Culinary Academy, and it is presently part of the Academy of Art University campus. The California Hall has been listed as a San Francisco Designated Landmark since October 7, 1984.

History 
In 1912, when the Das Deutsches Haus was built, Polkstrasse (now Polk Street) was a main commercial shopping center for German immigrants. The architect was Frederick H. Meyer and the design of the building was influenced by the Heidelberg Castle in Heidelberg, Baden-Württemberg, Germany. There was a restaurant in the basement called the Rathskeller.

It was originally used as a meeting space by 43 German societies and fraternities. During World War I, the build name was changed to California Hall. German American Bund, a Nazi organization for Americans of German-descent, had held meetings in the building prior to World War II.

The building was featured in the action movie, Dirty Harry (1971).

1965 New Years Ball 
In the 1950s gay men started to visit Polk Street, specifically the area near California Hall in Lower Polk. The 1965 New Years Ball (a fundraiser for the Council on Religion and the Homosexual, and other homophile organizations) was held January 1, 1965 at the California Hall. During the event, the police interfered with the gay attendees by taking photos of each person entering the building; which prompted a legal battle led by Evander Smith and Herb Donaldson. The 1965 event had marked a turning point in gay rights on the west coast. 

By 1971, Polk Street was advertised as "one of the gayest streets in San Francisco". A migration from Polk Street to the Castro District happened in the 1970s for more affordable housing.

Music venue 
The space served as a periodic concert hall, primarily for rock bands in the mid-1960s. In 1965, the venue hosted two productions by Family Dog; The Charlatans with the Ken Kesey and the Merry Pranksters Acid Tests happening (at the same time at The Fillmore, a bus moved between the two music halls).

The Grateful Dead played with The Charlatans on May 29, 1966; and on October 31, 1966 with Quicksilver Messenger Service and Mimi Farina. On June 19, 1966, Carlos Santana played with the three person Mockers band.

On August 28, 1977, punk bands played including the Avengers, The Nuns, and Mary Monday. The last concerts were held in 1983.

References

Further reading 
 Season 2, episode 9 of the podcast “Making Gay History” is about Donaldson and Evander Smith

Civic Center, San Francisco
San Francisco Designated Landmarks
Music venues in San Francisco
1910s architecture in the United States
German-American history
German American Bund
LGBT history in San Francisco
German Baroque
Baroque Revival architecture in the United States